The Grange Festival is a summer opera festival established to continue performances at The Grange opera house in Hampshire. The first season started on 7 June 2017 and featured operas by Monteverdi, Bizet and Britten.

History 

Opera at The Grange, Northington was established in 1998 by the founders of Grange Park Opera, Wasfi Kani and Michael Moody. A new, award-winning opera house was built at the site in 2002. After seventeen years, Grange Park Opera decided to relocate at the end of the 2016 season, following a dispute over a new lease. The Grange Festival was formed in January 2016 with Michael Chance CBE, Rachel Pearson and Michael Moody as co-founders. The Bournemouth Symphony Orchestra and The Academy of Ancient Music were named as the festival's orchestras in residence.

Performances 

The Grange Festival opened on 7 June 2017 with Monteverdi's Il ritorno d'Ulisse in patria directed by Tim Supple. Bizet's Carmen was directed by Annabel Arden and conducted by Jean-Luc Tinguaud. Albert Herring brought together conductor Steuart Bedford and director, John Copley who both knew and worked with Benjamin Britten. Albert Herring was nominated in the best opera category of the 2018 South Bank Sky Arts Awards

In September 2017 the company staged a newly orchestrated production of Jonathan Dove's Mansfield Park.

The 2018 season opened with DANCE@THEGRANGE directed by Wayne McGregor and Edward Watson, followed by a well-received  production of Handel's Agrippina with the Academy of Ancient Music. The Barber of Seville by Rossini directed by Stephen Barlow followed. Copley returned to direct Mozart's The Abduction from the Seraglio and a single concert performance of Candide by Leonard Bernstein completed the season.

In 2019 McGregor returned with performances of 21st Century Women. The three operas were Mozart's The Marriage of Figaro directed by Martin Lloyd Evans and conducted by Richard Egarr with the Academy of Ancient Music, Falstaff by Giuseppe Verdi and an operatic production of Handel's oratorio, Belshazzar. There was also a single concert by the John Wilson Orchestra entitled Gershwin in Hollywood.

The 2020 season was to be Rossini's La Cenerentola directed by Stephen Barlow and conducted by David Parry. Britten's A Midsummer Night's Dream directed by Paul Curran will be conducted by Anthony Kraus, with performances falling on the 60th anniversary of the premiere (11 June), as well as on the Summer Solstice (20 June) and Midsummer's Day (24 June). Francesco Cilluffo returns to conduct Puccini's Manon Lescaut in a new production by Stephen Lawless. The season will also see the return of Dance@TheGrange directed by Wayne McGregor, and concert performances of Lerner & Loewe's My Fair Lady conducted by Alfonso Casado Trigo and directed by Paul Curran. Due to the coronavirus pandemic, the festival was cancelled on 18 March 2020.

In response to the coronavirus pandemic, an outdoor 'promenade' production entitled Precipice, compiled by director and writer Sinéad O'Neill and designer Joanna Parker, was performed over the weekend of 22/23 August 2020. This work incorporated opera, acrobatics, dance, choral and instrumental music and received generally positive reviews.

Other Events 
The final of The Grange Festival International Singing Competition took place on 24 September 2017. British soprano, Rowan Pierce, took the top prize of £7500 and a role in a future Grange Festival production.  Pierce made her debut in the 2019 season as Barbarina in the Marriage of Figaro.

References

Further reading
Grange Park Opera plans 700-seat woodland La Scala. The Stage.
Southern Daily Echo
Grange Festival announces key appointments. Opera Now
Hampshire Chronicle
Dorking and Leatherhead Advertiser
"Michael Chance, the new artistic director of The Grange Festival, tells John Goodall about his plans ..." . Country Life.

External links 
 

Music festivals in Hampshire
Opera festivals